The 1961 24 Hours of Le Mans was a motor race for Sports cars and Grand Touring cars staged at the Circuit de la Sarthe, Le Mans, France on 10 and 11 June 1961. It was the 29th Grand Prix of Endurance and the fourth race of the 1961 World Sportscar Championship. Ferrari and Maserati were the main contenders, with Aston Martin an outside chance.

Ferrari's competition soon wilted in the race – the Maseratis were fast but fragile. The Aston Martins, though reliable, couldn't match the Italian cars’ pace. In the end it was a race between the two works team cars and the North American Racing Team entry driven by the Rodriguez brothers. When the private entry failed with just two hours to go, it was a clear 1–2 result for the Ferrari works team with the Olivier Gendebien, Phil Hill Ferrari 250 TRI/61 winning from the similar car driven by Mike Parkes and Willy Mairesse. A privately-entered Ferrari GT 250 was third with an American-run Maserati Tipo 63 fighting it way back up to fourth, a full 22 laps behind the winning car.

Regulations
The second year of the new FIA regulations did not see significant changes. The controversial windscreen rules regarding minimum height and width were also updated with a maximum slope, which closed the loophole that Maserati had cleverly worked around in the previous year.

For its part, race-organisers, the Automobile Club de l'Ouest (ACO) increased the maximum continuous driving stint up from 52 to 60 laps, given the faster speeds the cars were running at. However, the total driving time remained at 14 hours per driver. The time to complete the final lap time-limit was shortened from 30 to 20 minutes to reduce the incidents of slow or stationary cars out on the circuit trying to run down the clock to finish.

Scrutineering was moved from the Place des Jacobins in Le Mans city to the circuit. Finally, this year the ACO trialled a new IBM race-timing computer system (which had a few teething problems) and opened the first French automobile museum.

Entries
With the dropping interest in the World Championship, from both manufacturers and fans, there were only 65 entries in total for the race. With two entries rejected, there were 55 starters and 8 reserves. It could be said that the modern Le Mans started in 1961 with the presence of significant mid- and rear-engined cars.

Official ‘works’ entries numbered 26, although Maserati and Aston Martin both gave support to their customer teams. Biggest team presence was the 5-strong Deutsch & Bonnet team, with 4-car entries from the Scuderia Ferrari, Porsche, Abarth and NART teams.

Once again Ferrari dominated the entry list with 11 cars spreads across both the Sport and GT divisions. The racing division of the company was now entitled Societa Esercizio Fabbriche Automobili e Corse (SEFAC) and it arrived with four cars. Two were the latest iteration of the proven Testarossa race-winner, for their best endurance-racing partnership: Phil Hill / Olivier Gendebien as well as Willy Mairesse with Ferrari-debutante Mike Parkes. There was also the new, very fast, mid-engined Ferrari 246 SP which had already impressed in the season to be driven Ferrari's lead F1 drivers Wolfgang von Trips / Richie Ginther. The 2.4-litre V6 engine developed 270 bhp. The final works entry was a prototype of the new GT car being built for the upcoming 1962 rules changes. It still had the 3-litre V12 engine used in the Testarossa and was driven by Giancarlo Baghetti and Fernand Tavano (who had won the GT-division in the 1960 race as a Ferrari privateer). The North American Racing Team (NART) was also entered, with the TR61 car that had won the Sebring race. It would be driven by the very fast, young, Rodriguez brothers, Pedro and Ricardo

Maserati arrived with a new model, the Tipo 63, with a mid-mounted, 3-litre variant of the famous 250F V12 Grand Prix engine. It was said to be capable of 300 kp/h (185 mph) on the Mulsanne Straight. Two were entered by Briggs Cunningham, who had raced it at Sebring and a third for the Scuderia Serenissima, who had run it in the Targa Florio. Camoradi did not send its cars this year. Cunningham himself was entered with Bill Kimberley in a longtail 2-litre T60.

Representing Great Britain was Aston Martin and Cooper. Jaguar was a notable absentee for the first time since 1950. The Border Reivers, the only team to break up the Ferrari monopoly at the previous year's results, returned with their DBR1/300. This year Jim Clark was paired with two-time winner Ron Flockhart. His former team, Ecurie Ecosse, ran the new Cooper T57. Running with the 2.6-litre FPF Climax engine it was underpowered on the straights, but excellent handling kept it competitive.

Porsche arrived with three of their new RS61 cars, each with a different Flat-four engine. The 2-litre variant now developed 185 bhp with a top speed of 155 mph (250 kp/h). It was driven by Masten Gregory and Bob Holbert. The two coupés were driven by the Porsche F1 team drivers Hans Herrmann / Edgar Barth and Jo Bonnier/Dan Gurney.

Completing the 2-litre field, Triumph once again entered three cars in the Sports division, as its TR4 had not been homologated for GT racing as yet.

The smaller-engined classes were well supported once again, with Abarth, Austin Healey and OSCA taking on the dominant Deutsch et Bonnet cars. As well as the standard, reliable HBR-4 cars, DB also introduced its new mid-engined HBR-5 spyder for Vidilles/Moynet.

Six Abarth entries included four works cars. The little 701cc Fiat engine developed a mere 64 bhp. A special 850cc-variant (developing 73 bhp and doing 120 mph on the Mulsanne straight) was in the reserves to be driven by New Zealanders Denis Hulme/Angus Hyslop. OSCA arrived with one of their successful 750 Sport cars as a works entry and an up-engined 988cc entered by NART for the Index prizes.

Once again the GT division was dominated by Ferrari with seven privateer entries. Stirling Moss was back, with Graham Hill, this time in a Ferrari co-entered by Rob Walker and NART. This year, their main competition would come from the Aston Martin DB4s of John Ogier's new Essex Racing Team (who also ran a DBR1/300 in the Sports division) and French privateer Jean Kerguen. Re-styled by Zagato, they were the biggest cars in the field with their 3.7-litre engines.

Otherwise, the mid-range GT classes were rather limited. A pair of French AC Aces were the only entries in the 2-litre class, Lotus had the 1.3-litre category to itself with five Elites entered including two works cars. There was competition in the 1.6-litre class though, with Porsche up against Sunbeam returning to Le Mans after over 30 years away

Curiously, Chris Lawrence's Morgan 4+4 entry was rejected by the ACO because it looked, essentially, too old-fashioned and not meeting the ‘spirit of the race’.

Practice
Over the April test weekend, the Ferrari 246 SP was fastest, three seconds ahead of Hill in the Testarossa and fully nine seconds from the Maserati Tipo 63s. The Ferrari 250 GT was fully 20 seconds faster than its Aston Martin competition. However, Jo Schlesser crashed one of the GTs, breaking his arm and leg, keeping him out of the race.

In official practice, Ginther in the 246 SP was again fastest. Mike Parkes, who had never driven a Testarossa before, was immediately on the pace with 4th fastest time.

Race

Start

The day of the race started with light showers, but by the time 4pm came around the overcast conditions had dried out the circuit. Moss, as always, was quick but by dint of starting further up the grid, Jim Clark's Aston Martin was first car under the Dunlop bridge. Two of the last to get away were Mike Parkes’ Ferrari and Augie Pabst's Maserati. But at the end of the first lap, Ginther in the 246 SP led Hill's Testarossa, Hansgen's Maserati then Pedro Rodriguez in the NART Ferrari, Clark, Moss & Salvadori. Within five laps, Rodriguez had got to the front and together with Ginther and Hill they built a gap from the chasing pack, swapping places often. The first pitstops and driver-changes came after 90 minutes of racing. The 246SP was able to run up to 15 minutes longer before refuelling, therefore building up a bit of a lead.

The showers returned around 6pm, wet enough to make the track very slippery. Walt Hansgen went off at speed at Tertre Rouge, while running fourth. The impact broke his arm and cracked some vertebrae. Bill Halford, running 7th in the Ecosse Cooper soon after taking the wheel, went off at the Dunlop Curve, hitting the embankment at nearly 200 km/h (120 mph). The car rolled, throwing Halford out but he luckily escaped with just scratches and bruises. Then Bill McKay crashed the Ecosse Sprite at Maison Blanche also breaking his arm.

Stirling Moss & Graham Hill had been putting in incredible lap-times with their Ferrari GT, easily leading the GT division, but also ahead of the Aston Martin and Maserati prototypes. Moss even recorded the 7th fastest racing lap ever on the circuit. By 7pm they were running fifth overall.

At 8pm, after four hours and two pitstops, the race order was the Ferraris of von Trips, P.Rodriguez, P.Hill and Parkes. Salvadori was 5th, the last car on the lead lap. Then came the Ferrari GTs of Moss, Tavano and Noblet with Clark in 9th. The UDT Lotus was leading the Index of Performance, with von Trips in second .

Night
The rain continued into the early evening. Then about 10.30pm Ginther had to pit to have its lights fixed that cost them 10 minutes and several laps. This left Hill/Gendebien ahead of the rival Rodriguez brothers then their teammates Parkes/Mairesse. What prevented the race becoming a dull, repetitive procession was the inter-team rivalry between NART and the works team. Close racing in a damp night meant the lead changed repeatedly through the night. At 1am, after 9 hours, the two leading cars had done 123 laps, Parkes-Mairesse 3 laps back, then Ginther/von Trips, Moss/Hill and Salvadori/Maggs all on 118 laps. Seventh was the Pabst/Thompson Maserati two laps further back.

However, at 1.30am the Walker Ferrari was nobbled by a dislodged fan blade slicing a radiator hose, ending its fine run.
The Ferrari GT prototype had been running very well, staying in the top ten, stalking the Walker 250 GT, however in the early hours of Sunday it was retired with engine issues.
Not long before that Clark's Aston Martin had blown its engine on the Mulsanne straight while he was running 5th. The Essex Aston Martin of Salvadori/Maggs moved up to fifth place.

At 4am, the Rodriguez brothers led from the three works Ferraris, then the Aston Martin and the recovering Maserati. Noblet's Ferrari GT was 7th, ahead of Tavano's GT prototype, the leading Porsche (Bonnier/Gurney) and Trintignant's GT. The privateer DB of Masson/Armagnac was leading the Index of Performance from the Contrillier/Foitek Abarth.

Morning

By dawn the track was drying again. But at 7.30am, the NART car came into the pits with a bad misfire, and it took half an hour to fix. Von Trips and Ginther had driven hard after their delay and managed to get back up to second place, four laps behind Hill/Gendebien. But then at 8am, another bad miscalculation by the Ferrari team ran von Trips out of fuel in consecutive Le Mans. The Essex Aston Martin had been lapping consistently, moving up to 4th when the Ferrari retired. However it was retired mid-morning with a split, leaking, oil tank.

Another hard pursuit, this time by the NART Ferrari trying to make up their lost half hour, kept the spectators interested. By midday they had overtaken Mairesse and was in second. But the strain finally told on the engine and at 2pm, with just 2 hours to go, the Rodriguez’ Ferrari crawled into the pits with terminal engine issues. Bonnier and Gurney had been running a strong 5th but became the first Porsche retirement when its engine broke after 12.30pm. The French Aston Martin GT had been running well, 3rd in class behind the Ferraris and 9th overall. But with an hour to go, at its last pitstop, a mechanic left a spanner in the engine and it short-circuited the battery.

Finish and post-race

From there on, the team Ferraris held station with the race finishing under soft rain. Hill and Gendebien, the 1958 winners, won again finishing three laps ahead of their teammates Parkes/Mairesse. Third place, and thirteen laps further back, was the privateer Ferrari GT of Noblet/Guichet ahead of the Pabst/Thompson Maserati. Porsche had a better race this year, with the all-American Gregory/Holbert works car finishing an excellent 5th, after consistently running in the top-10 from Saturday night. The Herrmann/Barth car came in 7th, while the Porsche GT of Linge/Pon was 10th, easily winning its class.

Briggs Cunningham had an uncomplicated race in the 2-litre Maserati, never missing a beat as it finished 8th. In fact, it was the car that spent the shortest time in the pits during the race. Triumph again staged a formation finish, however this year its three cars were classified, the best one finishing 9th. In the competitive 850cc class, it was the two ‘Kiwis’ in the Abarth 850 that beat the chasing DBs home by a clear six laps. The Foitek/Condrillier Abarth had the great misfortune to break an oil-pipe on the penultimate lap preventing the Italian marque claiming a 1-2 class finish.

This 5th win for Ferrari put it on equal footing with Bentley and Jaguar for most victories. The win contributed to a significant year for Ferrari. Bandini and Scarfiotti won the final round at the new race at Pescara securing the World Championship. Baghetti went on a purple streak winning his first three F1 races and becoming the only driver to win an F1 World Championship race in his first opportunity, at Reims. Ferrari won the F1 Constructor's Championship and Phil Hill and Wolfgang von Trips were the two contenders for the Driver's title that was sadly decided when von Trips was killed at Monza.

This was also the last Le Mans for Stirling Moss who had a career-ending crash at Goodwood early in the next year. In his ten appearances he never won, but his speed and competitiveness was always a highlight for the spectators.

The Index of Performance again went to a DB, but not the works team. Instead it was the small Equipe Chardonnet which won the prize. The special Sunbeam coupé won the Index of Thermal Efficiiency, and the company promptly produced a short run of the “Harrington Le Mans” model to capitalise on its success.

This was the last year of the Sportscar World Championship (in its current form) as the FIA had decreed that going forward, the Championship would be based around GT cars.

Official results

Finishers
Results taken from Quentin Spurring's book, officially licensed by the ACO
Class Winners are in Bold text.

Did Not Finish

Did Not Start

Class Winners

Index of Thermal Efficiency

Index of Performance

Note: Only the top ten positions are included in this set of standings. A score of 1.00 means meeting the minimum distance for the car, and a higher score is exceeding the nominal target distance.

Statistics
Taken from Quentin Spurring's book, officially licensed by the ACO
 Fastest Lap in practice – Ginther, #23 Ferrari 246 SP – 4m 02.8s; 
 Fastest Lap – Ricardo Rodriguez, #17 Ferrari 250 TRI/61 – 3:59.5secs; 
 Distance – 
 Winner's Average Speed –

FIA World Sportscar Championship: Post-race Standings

Citations

References
 Clarke, R.M. - editor (2009)    Le Mans 'The Ferrari Years 1958-1965'    Cobham, Surrey: Brooklands Books  
 Clausager, Anders (1982)    Le Mans    London: Arthur Barker Ltd  
 Laban, Brian (2001)    Le Mans 24 Hours    London: Virgin Books   
 Moity, Christian (1974)    The Le Mans 24 Hour Race 1949-1973    Radnor, Pennsylvania: Chilton Book Co  
 Spurring, Quentin (2010)    Le Mans 1960-69    Yeovil, Somerset: Haynes Publishing  
 Wilkins, Gordon - editor (1961)    Automobile Year #9 1961-62    Lausanne: Edita S.A.

External links
 Racing Sports Cars – Le Mans 24 Hours 1961 entries, results, technical detail. Retrieved 21 November 2017
 Le Mans History – Le Mans History, hour-by-hour (incl. pictures, YouTube links). Retrieved 21 November 2017
  Sportscars.tv – race commentary. Retrieved 21 November 2017
  World Sports Racing Prototypes – results, reserve entries & chassis numbers. Retrieved 21 November 2017
  Team Dan – results & reserve entries, explaining driver listings. Retrieved 21 November 2017
  Unique Cars & Parts – results & reserve entries. Retrieved 21 November 2017
  Formula 2 – Le Mans 1961 results & reserve entries. Retrieved 10 August 2017
 YouTube “Corvette at Le Mans”	colour documentary by GM (35 mins). Retrieved 12 November 2017

24 Hours of Le Mans races
Le Mans
1961 in French motorsport